Magnus Magnusson,  (born Magnús Sigursteinsson; 12 October 1929 – 7 January 2007) was an Icelandic-born British-based journalist, translator, writer and television presenter. Born in Reykjavík, he lived in Scotland for almost all his life, although he never took British citizenship. He came to prominence as a BBC television journalist and was the presenter of the BBC television quiz programme Mastermind for 25 years. His catchphrase "I've started so I'll finish" was said whenever the time ran out while he was reading a question on the show.

Early life
Magnús Sigursteinsson was born in Reykjavík on 12 October 1929, but grew up in Edinburgh, where his father, Sigursteinn Magnússon, was the Icelandic consul. In Scotland his family adopted a British naming convention, and from childhood Magnus used his father's patronymic as a surname.

Magnusson lived with his family in John Street, Joppa, an eastern suburb of Edinburgh. He was educated at the Edinburgh Academy, where he was in the school's marching brass band, and at Jesus College, Oxford.

Career

Journalism
After graduating from the university he became a reporter with the Scottish Daily Express and The Scotsman. Between 1962 and 1964 he edited the Saltire Society's magazine New Saltire. He went freelance in 1967, then joined the BBC, presenting programmes on history and archaeology including Chronicle and BC The Archaeology of the Bible Lands, as well as appearing in news programmes.

Mastermind
Magnusson presented the long-running quiz show Mastermind from 1972 to 1997 on BBC1. His catchphrase, which one of his successors John Humphrys continued to use, was "I've started so I'll finish". Magnusson made cameo appearances as himself, hosting Mastermind in Morecambe and Wise as well as the children's series Dizzy Heights and as Magnus Magnesium in The Goodies episode "Frankenfido".

Magnusson ended his 25-year run hosting Mastermind in September 1997, and the original black chair was given to him at the end of the production, passing to his daughter Sally Magnusson after his death.

Magnusson later returned to present a one-off celebrity special, originally broadcast on 30 December 2002 on BBC Two, to celebrate the 30th anniversary of the first ever Mastermind final. This was a precursor to the main show returning to the BBC with Humphrys as the new host. Shortly before his death, Magnusson returned to the regular Mastermind series to present the trophy to the 2006 champion Geoff Thomas. Sally Magnusson presented the trophy to the next series winner, David Clark, while also paying tribute to her father and his legacy to the show.

Books 
 Scotland: The Story of a Nation
 Introducing Archaeology
 Viking Expansion Westwards
 The Clacken and the Slate (The Edinburgh Academy, 1824 – 1974)
 Viking Hammer of the North
 BC: The Archaeology of the Bible Lands
 Landlord or Tenant?: A View of Irish History
 Iceland
 Vikings!
 Magnus on the Move
 Treasures of Scotland
 Lindisfarne: The Cradle Island
 Reader's Digest Book of Facts (ed.)
 Iceland Saga
 Chambers Biographical Dictionary (ed., 5th edition)
 The Nature of Scotland (ed.)
 I've Started, So I'll Finish
 Rum: Nature's Island
 Magnus Magnusson's Quiz Book

Translator
Magnusson translated or co-translated a variety of books from modern Icelandic and Old Norse into English. Among these are several works by Halldór Laxness, the Nobel prize-winning novelist from Iceland, as well as a number of Norse sagas, which he co-translated (with Hermann Pálsson) for Penguin Classics: Njal's Saga (1960), The Vinland Sagas (1965), King Harald's Saga (1966) and Laxdæla Saga (1969). 

In 1968 he appeared as a storyteller in five episodes of the BBC children's programme Jackanory, narrating English translations of 'Stories from Iceland'. 

Magnusson was also the author of a popular history of the Viking Age, called The Vikings (revised edition, 2000).

Awards and charity positions
Magnusson was given the honorary award of Knight Commander of the Order of the British Empire in 1989. 

He was elected President of the Royal Society for the Protection of Birds at its 94th annual general meeting in October 1995, succeeding Max Nicholson, and held the office until 2000. He was founder chairman of Scottish Natural Heritage from 1992 and founder chairman of the Scottish Churches Architectural Heritage Trust in 1978 (it became Scotland's Churches Trust in 2012).

He was Lord Rector of Edinburgh University from 1975 to 1978 and in 2002 he became Chancellor of Glasgow Caledonian University. The Magnus Magnusson Fellowship, an intellectual group based at the Glasgow Caledonian University, was named in his honour.

Later life

In later years Magnusson also wrote for the New Statesman. 

On 12 October 2006, his 77th birthday, Magnusson was diagnosed with pancreatic cancer. Magnusson mordantly noted that "This has to be one of my worst birthdays ever." His condition forced him to cancel a string of public appearances. He died on 7 January 2007. The Aigas Field Centre has a building named the Magnus House in his honour.

Family
Magnusson was married to Mamie Baird from 1954 until his death. They had five children. Their eldest son, Siggi, died in a traffic accident in 1973, when he was struck by a vehicle close to the Glasgow Academy playing fields at Anniesland in the city's West End. Their daughter Sally is a journalist, writer and TV presenter, and youngest son Jon is a TV producer, writer and director.

Bibliography
Viking Expansion Westwards (1973), 
The Clacken and the Slate (1974), 
Viking, Hammer of the North (1976), 
BC The Archaeology of the Bible Lands (1977), 
The Vikings (1980), 
Lindisfarne, The Cradle Island (1984), 
Chambers Biographical Dictionary (1990), as General Editor,  Hardback
Scotland Since Prehistory: Natural Change and Human Impact (1993), 
I've Started So I'll Finish (1998), 
Scotland: The Story of a Nation (2000), 
Lindisfarne (2004), 
Fakers, Forgers and Phoneys: Famous Scams and Scamps (2005), 
Iceland Saga (2005), 
Keeping Your Words: An Anthology of Quotations (2005),

References

External links
Magnus Magnusson Fund, Glasgow Caledonian University
The Magnus Magnusson Fellowship
Magnus Magnusson quotations

1929 births
2007 deaths
20th-century Icelandic people
Alumni of Jesus College, Oxford
BBC television presenters
Deaths from cancer in Scotland
Deaths from pancreatic cancer
People educated at Edinburgh Academy
Honorary Knights Commander of the Order of the British Empire
Icelandic expatriates in Scotland
Icelandic television personalities
Icelandic non-fiction writers
Icelandic–English translators
Television personalities from Edinburgh
Rutherglen
People associated with Glasgow Caledonian University
Royal Society for the Protection of Birds people
People from Reykjavík
Rectors of the University of Edinburgh
20th-century British translators
Icelandic emigrants to Scotland
Scottish television presenters
Scottish non-fiction writers
Icelandic translators
Scottish translators